Brian West (born June 10, 1978 in LaGrange, Georgia) is an American retired soccer striker.

Club career
West played two years of college soccer at the University of Virginia. He left after his sophomore year, becoming one of the first Project-40 players in Major League Soccer. West would go on to play six years for the Columbus Crew, scoring 18 league goals and 29 assists in the process.

Brian became the first Project-40 player to graduate from college, earning his degree in Information Systems from Ohio State University. He left MLS after the 2003 season for a transfer to Norway. He is now retired due to injury troubles and has settled down in Fredrikstad where he works in the stock market.

International career
West made his debut with the US national team on April 26, 2000 against Russia. He played his last international match on April 3, 2002, a 1-0 home win over Mexico.

Honours

Club
Columbus Crew
 Lamar Hunt U.S. Open Cup: 2002

Fredrikstad FK
 Norwegian football cup: 2006

External links

1978 births
Living people
American soccer players
African-American soccer players
Soccer players from Georgia (U.S. state)
Expatriate footballers in Norway
Columbus Crew players
Virginia Cavaliers men's soccer players
Ohio State University alumni
Fredrikstad FK players
United States men's under-20 international soccer players
United States men's international soccer players
American expatriate soccer players
Major League Soccer players
Eliteserien players
American expatriate sportspeople in Norway
MLS Pro-40 players
A-League (1995–2004) players
2002 CONCACAF Gold Cup players
CONCACAF Gold Cup-winning players
Association football midfielders
21st-century African-American sportspeople
20th-century African-American sportspeople